First Christian Church, also known as First Church of Christ, is an historic Disciples of Christ (DOC) church located at 126 S. Main Street in Robersonville, North Carolina, Martin County, North Carolina and was built in 1913. It is a one-story, brick-veneered, Romanesque Revival building with a cross-gable facade.  The front facade features three arched stained-glass windows and a two-story corner bell tower.  Also on the property is a contributing church cemetery.

It was added to the National Register of Historic Places in 2005.

References

Christian Church (Disciples of Christ) congregations
Churches on the National Register of Historic Places in North Carolina
Churches completed in 1913
Churches in Martin County, North Carolina
National Register of Historic Places in Martin County, North Carolina
1913 establishments in North Carolina